Mária Tressel (born 29 July 1946) is a Hungarian gymnast. She competed in six events at the 1964 Summer Olympics.

References

1946 births
Living people
Hungarian female artistic gymnasts
Olympic gymnasts of Hungary
Gymnasts at the 1964 Summer Olympics
Gymnasts from Budapest